Qeqertarsuaq, meaning 'The Large Island' in the Greenlandic language ( meaning 'big island' as well), is an uninhabited island in the Sermersooq municipality in southwestern Greenland.

Geography

The two sibling islands are Qoornuup Qeqertarsua Island and Sermitsiaq Island.

See also
List of islands of Greenland
Storø, another Greenlandic island located on the east coast.
Disko Island, in Greenlandic Qeqertarsuaq, located in Disko Bay.

References 

Uninhabited islands of Greenland